Butambala District is a district in the Central Region of Uganda.

Location
This district is bordered by Gomba District to the west and north-west, Mityana District to the north-east, Mpigi District to the east and south, and Kalungu District to the south-west.

History
Created by an act of parliament, the district became operational on 1 July 2010, having been split off of Mpigi District, together with neighboring Gomba District. Before becoming district, the area was Butambala County, one of the eighteen counties that constitute the Kingdom of Buganda.

Population
The national population census in 1991 estimated the district population at 74,100. The 2002 census put the population at about 86,800. In 2012, the population was estimated a 99,400.

Economic activity
Subsistence agriculture and small-scale animal husbandry are the backbone of Butambala District's economy. The main food crops are:

 Beans
 Groundnuts
 Sugar cane
 Bananas
 Matooke
 Maize
 Mangoes

References

External links
 Butambala District
Butambala District Has One Hospital

 
Districts of Uganda
Central Region, Uganda